Cheilopogon pinnatibarbatus, Bennett's flying fish, is a species of flying fish which has a circumglobal distribution in tropical and subtropical seas. It is an epiplegaic species which feeds on zooplankton and small fishes and is capable of leaping out of the water and gliding over the surface.

Subspecies
There are four subspecies of this widely distributed flying fish:
 Cheilopogon pinnatibarbatus pinnatibarbatus (Bennett, 1831) (Bennett's flyingfish) - Atlantic and western Indian Ocean
 Cheilopogon pinnatibarbatus californicus (J. G. Cooper, 1863) (California flyingfish) - Eastern Pacific Ocean, from Oregon to Baja California
 Cheilopogon pinnatibarbatus japonicus (V. Franz, 1910) - north western Pacific Ocean, around Japan
 Cheilopogon pinnatibarbatus melanocercus (J. D. Ogilby, 1885) (Australasian flying fish)  - southwestern Pacific, eastern Australia and New Zealand

References

pinnatibarbatus
Fish described in 1831